Jaktens tid is the second studio album by the Finnish folk metal band Finntroll, released on 18 September 2001 through Spinefarm Records.

Track listing

All lyrics are written by Katla (except track 9: traditional arr. Stake). 
Tracks 2, 5 and 12 music by Somnium.
Tracks 3, 6, 10 and 11 music by Trollhorn.
Tracks 4 and 7 music by Somnium/Trollhorn.
Track 8 music by Trollhorn/Tundra.
Track 9 music traditional arr. Lundmark.

Personnel 
 Jan "Katla" Jämsen – vocals
 Samuli "Skrymer" Ponsimaa – rhythm guitar
 Teemu "Somnium" Raimoranta – lead, rhythm & acoustic guitar, choirs
 Samu "Beast Dominator" Ruotsalainen – drums, percussion, choirs
 Henri "Trollhorn" Sorvali – keyboards
 Sami "Tundra" Uusitalo – bass, choirs

Additional personnel
 Jonne Järvelä – joik-singing and choirs
 Hanky Bannister – banjo
 Vicar Tapio Wilska – Latin mumblings

References

Finntroll albums
2001 albums